Mathilde ("Milly") Emilie Reuter (1 October 1904 in Rödelheim - 30 April 1976 in Frankfurt am Main) was a German track and field athlete who competed in the 1928 Summer Olympics.

In 1928 she finished fourth in the discus throw event.

External links
profile

1904 births
1976 deaths
German female discus throwers
Olympic athletes of Germany
Athletes (track and field) at the 1928 Summer Olympics
World record setters in athletics (track and field)
Sportspeople from Frankfurt